William Berly House is a historic home located at Lexington, Lexington County, South Carolina. It was built by 1832, and is a two-story, clapboard dwelling.  It features a one-story porch supported by four square columns. The house originally was in the dogtrot form.  It has a one-story wing attached to the main house by an enclosed breezeways around 1900. Also on the property is a contributing former ice house.  It was the home of Reverend William Berly, a leading religious and educational figure in area Lutheranism during the mid-19th century.

It was listed on the National Register of Historic Places in 1977.

References

Houses on the National Register of Historic Places in South Carolina
Houses completed in 1860
Houses in Lexington County, South Carolina
National Register of Historic Places in Lexington County, South Carolina